Jerome is a city in and county seat of Jerome County, Idaho, United States. The population was 10,890 at the 2010 census, up from 7,780 in 2000. The city is the county seat of Jerome County, and is part of the Twin Falls Micropolitan Statistical Area. Jerome's economy is largely agrarian, with dairy farming being one of the main revenue sources for the local economy.

Demographics

2010 census
At the 2010 census there were 10,890 people, 3,693 households, and 2,640 families living in the city. The racial makeup of the city was 78.3% White, 0.4% African American, 1.8% Native American, 0.4% Asian, 0.1% Pacific Islander, 16.7% from other races, and 2.2% from two or more races. Hispanic or Latino of any race were 34.3%.

Of the 3,693 households 45.1% had children under the age of 18 living with them, 49.6% were married couples living together, 13.6% had a female householder with no husband present, 8.3% had a male householder with no wife present, and 28.5% were non-families. 23.5% of households were one person and 10.6% were one person aged 65 or older. The average household size was 2.92 and the average family size was 3.44.

The median age was 28.9 years. 33% of residents were under the age of 18; 10.6% were between the ages of 18 and 24; 27.2% were from 25 to 44; 19.1% were from 45 to 64; and 10.2% were 65 or older. The gender makeup of the city was 50.4% male and 49.6% female.

2000 census

At the 2000 census there were 7,780 people, 2,776 households, and 1,959 families living in the city. The racial makeup of the city was 72.47% white, 0.18% African American, 0.91% Native American, 0.23% Asian, 0.06% Pacific Islander, 9.64% from other races, and 2.51% from two or more races. Hispanic or Latino of any race were 30.92%.

Of the 2,776 households 38.5% had children under the age of 18 living with them, 53.8% were married couples living together, 11.2% had a female householder with no husband present, and 29.4% were non-families. 24.6% of households were one person and 11.7% were one person aged 65 or older. The average household size was 2.77 and the average family size was 3.32.

The age distribution was 31.6% under the age of 18, 9.9% from 18 to 24, 27.9% from 25 to 44, 17.3% from 45 to 64, and 13.3% 65 or older. The median age was 31 years. For every 100 females, there were 99.0 males. For every 100 females age 18 and over, there were 95.7 males.

The median household income was $30,074 and the median family income was $34,046. Males had a median income of $26,000 versus $19,162 for females. The per capita income for the city was $13,023. About 12.9% of families and 15.5% of the population were below the poverty line, including 21.8% of those under age 18 and 12.3% of those age 65 or over.

Geography 

Jerome is actually a desert, when the settlers first settled, it was a basalt rich desert with only small bushes for vegetation.

Climate 
The climate is cold semi-arid (Köppen: BSk), typical of the plateaus of the American West, although its temperature variation resembles a continental climate.

Education
Jerome is home to Jerome High School.

Notable people

 Dolores Crow, politician and legislator, raised and lived in Jerome.
 Ken Dayley, MLB pitcher, was born in Jerome.
 Robyn Hilton, actress, graduated from Jerome High School in 1958.
 Jack Nelsen, member of the Idaho House of Representatives, lives in Jerome
 William Royer, Congressman, was born in Jerome.
 Nikki Sixx, the bassist for the rock band Mötley Crüe, lived in Jerome.

See also

 List of cities in Idaho

References

External links

 
 Chamber of Commerce - Jerome, Idaho
 Jerome School District

Cities in Idaho
Cities in Jerome County, Idaho
County seats in Idaho
Twin Falls, Idaho metropolitan area